L69 may refer to: 
 Albatros L 69, a 1920s German two-seat trainer aircraft
 HMS L69, a 1917 British L class submarine
 HMS Tanatside (L69), a 1942 British Hunt class destroyer
 a type of Chevrolet Small-Block engine
 L69 Group, group of countries supporting United Nations Reforms

ℓ 69 may refer to :
 Lectionary 69, a 12th-century Greek manuscript of the New Testament on vellum leaves